Simone Romagnoli (born 9 February 1990) is an Italian professional footballer who plays as a defender for  club Lecce.

Club career

Early career 
Born in Cremona, Romagnoli joined Milan from Cremonese in January 2007, shortly before turning 17. Throughout his time in the club's youth system, he has been a member of the under-17 squad who won the Campionato Nazionale Allievi in 2007, as well as the captain of the under-20 side who won the Coppa Italia Primavera in 2010, 25 years after their last success.

During the 2009–10 season, Romagnoli also started being selected for the first-team. In particular, he was named on the bench for a league match against Palermo, though he did not come on.

Foggia 
In order to gain some first team experience, Romagnoli was loaned out to Prima Divisione club Foggia for the 2010–11 season. He made his official debut for the club in the first game of the Coppa Italia Lega Pro group stage against L'Aquila — which Foggia won 2–1 – on 14 August 2010. The next week, in the first league game of the season, he also scored his maiden goal with a header from a corner.

Pescara 
On 8 July 2011, after the end of the loan to the Foggia, he moved from Milan to the Serie B team Pescara on a co-ownership deal.

Parma 
On 24 June 2022, Romagnoli signed with Parma.

Lecce 
On 31 January 2023, Romagnoli joined Lecce in Serie A.

International career
He made his debut with the Italy U-21 team on 4 June 2012, in a match against Republic of Ireland.

References

External links 
 
 Profile at official club website
 Profile at Assocalciatori.it

Living people
1990 births
Sportspeople from Cremona
Footballers from Lombardy
Association football defenders
Italian footballers
Italy under-21 international footballers
Serie A players
Serie B players
Serie C players
A.C. Milan players
Calcio Foggia 1920 players
Delfino Pescara 1936 players
Spezia Calcio players
A.C. Carpi players
Empoli F.C. players
Brescia Calcio players
Parma Calcio 1913 players
U.S. Lecce players